Piast Cieszyn is a Polish sports club, founded in 1909 in Cieszyn. As of 2021, they compete in the Skoczow-Żywiec regional league. In the past, the club was known as Stal Cieszyn. Piast matches are played at the Municipal Stadium at ul. Jana Łyska 21 in Cieszyn.

Ireneusz Jeleń is the Piast's most famous home-grown player. Here he started and ended his football career.

Honours 
 III league - 1959, 1959-1960
 1/16 of the Polish Cup final - 1964–65
 1st round of the Polish Cup - 1984–85
 The OZPN Polish Cup in Bielsko-Biała - 1983–84

References

External links
 Piast Cieszyn (2002–20) and CKS Piast Cieszyn (from 2020) at 90minut.pl

Football clubs in Silesian Voivodeship
Cieszyn